Rhenania is the Latinised name for the Rhineland or the Rhenish in a wider sense and may refer to:

 Rhenania Alt, an ale from the German brewer Krombacher Brewery
 Rhenania Buchversand, a German publishing company
 Rhenania-Ossag, a German mineral oil company; see German-American Petroleum Company
 BSV Limburgia, a Dutch football club originally named Rhenania
 Corps Rhenania Heidelberg, a student fraternity in Heidelberg, Germany
 Corps Rhenania Tübingen, a student fraternity in Tübingen, Germany
 SS Rhenania, a list of ships

See also
 Rhenanida, an order of scaly placoderms